95th Street–Longwood Manor station is a commuter railroad station on Metra's Rock Island District line in the Longwood Manor neighborhood of the Washington Heights section of Chicago, Illinois, at 9501 South Vincennes Avenue at the corner of 95th Street (US 12-20).

As of 2022, 95th—Longwood Manor is served by eight inbound trains and nine outbound trains on weekdays. It is served during peak hours only, although it does get served by some reverse peak trains.

The station is little more than an open acrylic glass shelter and is used only during rush hours. Regular service with more frequent trains is at 95th Street–Beverly Hills station west of this station. Parking is available south of 95th Street along Vincennes Avenue, and east of the station along Genoa Avenue, also off of 95th Street.

Bus connections
CTA
  N9 Ashland 
  95 95th 
  112 Vincennes/111th 

Pace
  381 95th Street 
  395 95th/Dan Ryan CTA/UPS Hodgkins (Weekday UPS shifts only)

References

External links

Station from 95th Street from Google Maps Street View

Metra stations in Chicago